The Shiguan kindergarten attack occurred at a kindergarten in Shiguan village in Gongyi, Henan, People's Republic of China, on May 8, 2006. At about 9:00 that morning, 18-year-old Bai Ningyang entered a classroom on the second floor of the kindergarten, which was reported to have been run illegally. In there were 21 children and a female teacher, who, according to locals, had rejected his advances. Threatening them with a knife, Bai forced the whole class to the back of the room. He then locked the door and poured gasoline from two bottles on the floor. Before setting it on fire and escaping he told one child, whose parents he knew, to leave. Two five-year-old children died at the scene, ten more succumbed to their wounds in hospital, and four others, as well as the teacher, were injured.

The next day, during an extensive search operation involving 800 police officers, Bai was found hiding in a cave in the nearby mountains and arrested. He was sentenced to death and executed.

Two days prior to the attack, on May 6, Bai had a quarrel with a farmer who had stopped him when using a newly paved road. Later that day he armed himself with two knives and chased the man through the village. When his father tried to intervene he took a five-year-old boy hostage, though the child managed to free himself, whereupon Bai ran away.

References

External links

 China Nabs Suspect in Kindergarten Deaths, The Washington Post (May 9, 2006)
 Teenager Arrested for Kindergarten Arson Killing Three, english.cri.cn (May 10, 2006)
 深入調查：河南幼兒園縱火犯並非求愛不成, Xinhua (May 19, 2006)
 河南巩义幼儿园放火案被告终审被判死刑, chinanews.com.cn (December 7, 2007)

School massacres
Mass murder in 2006
Arson in China
History of Henan
May 2006 events in Asia
Kindergarten
2006 murders in China
21st-century mass murder in China